I Thank a Fool is a 1958 novel by the British writer Audrey Erskine Lindop. In the United States it was published by Doubleday under the alternative title of Mist over Talla.

In 1962 it was adapted into a film I Thank a Fool starring Susan Hayward, Peter Finch and Diane Cilento.

References

Bibliography
 Goble, Alan. The Complete Index to Literary Sources in Film. Walter de Gruyter, 1999.
 Vinson, James. Twentieth-Century Romance and Gothic Writers. Macmillan, 1982.

1958 British novels
Novels by Audrey Erskine Lindop
British thriller novels
British novels adapted into films
William Collins, Sons books